Steven Digman is an American musician, songwriter, journalist and inventor.

Songwriting discography
Eva by Heart (Eva Cassidy, 1998): "Say Goodbye"
Time After Time (Eva Cassidy, 2000): "Easy Street Dream", "Anniversary Song"
Call Off the Search (Katie Melua, 2005): "Anniversary Song"
Looking for You (Janine Davy, 2005): "How Much Longer", "Valentines on Christmas Day", "Let’s Go Out Tonight", "Looking For You", "Crying", "Happy Hour", "Hungry For You", "Happy Love Song", "Turn On The Memories"

Music imprints
The Best of Eva Cassidy (2001) – "Easy Street Dream"
The Eva Cassidy Songbook for Guitar (2005) – "Say Goodbye", "Anniversary Song"

Poetry publications
 The Art of Women... and Other Troubles (2005)
 The Art of God... and Other Troubles (2005)
 The Art of Witchful Thinking (2005)

Journalistic work 
 Picket News, weekly newspaper publication (Hagerstown, Maryland) - freelance writer
 Music Dish Network - associate writer 
 Musical Discoveries - freelance writer  
 Collected Sounds - freelance writer 
 The Irish Music Magazine (Dublin, Ireland) - freelance writer

Invention 
 Glow in the Dark Luminescent Violin Rosin; manufactured and distributed by Dodson's MFG.

External links
Official website
"Patent US6280654: Glow in the dark rosin". Google Patents.

Further reading
Oravec, Nathan. "Off the Record Steven Digman: Putting the Funk Back in Funkstown". Pickett News.
Bligh, Laura (September 2001). "Digman's 'Anniversary Song' and 'Say Goodbye' go single in UK". Eva Cassidy Web Site.
"Steven Digman, Violin & Publishing Company". Music Dish.

References

American male songwriters
American music journalists
21st-century American inventors
American male poets
Living people
Place of birth missing (living people)
Year of birth missing (living people)
American male non-fiction writers